Sport Nation is a magazine sports television programme produced by BBC Sport Scotland. The first edition was broadcast on BBC Two Scotland in March 2009 as Sport Monthly, but was relaunched as Sport Nation in 2011.

The programme is designed as a showcase for all levels of Scottish sport. Previous editions have also included interviews with some high-profile Scottish sportsmen and women in addition to popular and up-and-coming young sports stars. Features from each show are available to watch again on the show's website and the whole programme is available 7 days after transmission across the UK on the BBC iPlayer.

Presenters
Current reporters include Rhona McLeod, John Beattie, David Currie and Katie Still.

See also
 BBC Scotland
 BBC Sport

External links
 Sport Nation at BBC Online
 
 Sport Nation on Twitter

BBC Scotland television shows
Sports television in Scotland
British sports television series
BBC Sport
2009 British television series debuts
2010s British television series